WVTL (1570 kHz) is a commercial AM radio station broadcasting a classic country radio format to the Mohawk Valley in the U.S. state of New York.  It is licensed to Amsterdam, New York, and is owned by Roser Communications Network, Inc.  WVTL's radio studios and offices are in Florida, New York.

By day, WVTL is powered at 1,000 watts, non-directional.  But 1570 AM is a Canadian clear channel frequency.  So at night, to reduce interference, WVTL cuts its power to 204 watts.  Programming is also heard on 250 watt FM translator 104.7 W284BZ.

History
On , the station first signed on as WAFS.  It became WKOL in 1967 and WBUG in 1990.  The WVTL call sign began to be used in 2004.

In late December 2009, WVTL switched to a soft adult contemporary format.  Along with its FM translator station, WVTL was called "Lite 104.7 and 1570 AM". In late February 2016, the station adapted to a classic country format.

In October 2021, Roser Communications agreed to sell the station to Think Tank Media, owners of WENT.

FM translator
In addition to the main AM station at 1570 kHz, WVTL is relayed by an FM translator for those who prefer to listen in FM stereo.  The FM translator frequency is used as the primary frequency for station branding.

References

External links
FCC History Cards for WVTL

VTL
1961 establishments in New York (state)
Classic country radio stations in the United States